Stephen Hoiles is a former Australian rugby union player. He also represented the Australia national rugby union team 16 times between 2004 and 2008. He currently is the head coach of the LA Giltinis in Major League Rugby (MLR) where he won a championship in the team's inaugural season.

Career
Stephen Hoiles is a former International Rugby Union player for Australia. Hoiles represented the Wallabies for the first time in 2004 at the age of 22 in the Test match against Scotland. Prior to this he had represented Australia in 7's Rugby Union at the age of 20. His professional career spanned over 13 years with some significant setbacks along the way.

Stephen grew up in Sydney and is a member of the Randwick Rugby Club where he won the 2004 Sydney Club competition. His father Alan is also a former 1st grade player at Randwick who won three 1st grade premierships in the 70's.

Stephen played over 100 first grade games for his club side Randwick as well as over 100 Super Rugby games for the NSW Waratahs and the ACT Brumbies where he was captained for 3 seasons. His professional playing career was put on hold for three & a half seasons with a long term achilles injury. During this time Hoiles travelled to Sweden to have his foot operated on. This surgery allowed Hoiles to return to Professional Rugby where he joined the NSW Waratahs and was a starting member of the Super Rugby Championship winning team in 2014.

Having retired from playing in 2015, Hoiles began his role as a Rugby Commentator and TV presenter with Fox Sports. In 2018 Hoiles began coaching professionally where he is the current assistant coach of the Australian Mens 7's team.

https://www.smh.com.au/sport/rugby-union/nsw-waratahs-forward-stephen-hoiles-playing-through-tenacity-20140724-zwiz9.html

https://www.rugby.com.au/news/2018/09/21/hoiles-sevens-walsh

References

External links

Randwick profile
It's Rugby player profile

1981 births
Australian rugby union players
Australia international rugby union players
ACT Brumbies players
New South Wales Waratahs players
Living people
Rugby union number eights
Rugby union flankers
Rugby union players from Sydney
Male rugby sevens players
New South Wales Country Eagles players
Barbarian F.C. players